The 2013 Atlantic Sun Conference men's soccer tournament was the 35th edition of the tournament. The tournament decided the Atlantic Sun Conference champion and guaranteed representative into the 2013 NCAA Division I Men's Soccer Championship. Held at the FGCU Soccer Complex, the East Tennessee State Buccaneers won the title against the North Florida Ospreys

Qualification

Bracket

Schedule

Quarterfinals

Semifinals

A-Sun Championship

Statistical leaders

See also 
 Atlantic Sun Conference
 2013 Atlantic Sun Conference men's soccer season
 2013 NCAA Division I men's soccer season
 2013 NCAA Division I Men's Soccer Championship

References 

ASUN Men's Soccer Tournament